Beta Kappa Chi is a scholastic honor society that recognizes academic achievement among students in the fields of natural science and mathematics.

The society was founded at Lincoln University in 1923 and was admitted to the Association of College Honor Societies in 1961.

Beta Kappa Chi honor society has 67 active chapters across the United States, and a total membership of approximately 60,000.

See also
 Association of College Honor Societies

References

External links
 
 ACHS Beta Kappa Chi entry

Association of College Honor Societies
Honor societies
Student organizations established in 1923
1923 establishments in Pennsylvania